Caïman was an ironclad barbette ship built for the French Navy in the late 1870s and early 1880s. The ships were intended for coastal operations, and as such had a shallow draft and a low freeboard, which greatly hampered their seakeeping and thus reduced their ability to be usefully employed after entering service. Armament consisted of a pair of  guns in individual barbettes, the largest gun ever mounted on a French capital ship. Caïman was laid down in 1878 and was completed in 1887.

Due to their handling problems, Caïman and her sister ships saw little active service with the French fleet, instead spending most of their careers in the Reserve Squadron of the Mediterranean Fleet. During this period, the ship spent most of the year out of service with reduced crews, only being reactivated for the fleet maneuvers each year. She was modernized in 1900 with new guns, but by the early 1900s, numerous, more effective pre-dreadnought battleships had been built. These ships displaced Caïman and her sisters in the Reserve Squadron, and she was reduced to a guard ship in Toulon in 1902. She was struck from the naval register in 1911, converted into a hulk, and used in that capacity until 1927, when she was broken up.

Design

The Terrible class of barbette ships was designed in the late 1870s as part of a naval construction program that began under the post-Franco-Prussian War fleet plan of 1872. In addition, the oldest generation of French ironclads, built in the early-to-mid 1860s, were in poor condition and necessitated replacement. The Terrible class was intended to replace old monitors that had been built for coastal defense. The Terribles were based on the s, but were reduced in size to allow them to operate in shallower waters.

After entering service, the Terrible-class ships were found to have very poor seakeeping as a result of their shallow draft and insufficient freeboard, even in the relatively sheltered waters of the Mediterranean Sea. The Navy had little use for the ships, and through the 1880s and 1890s, a series of French naval ministers sought to find a role for the vessels, along with another ten coastal-defense type ironclads built during that period. The ships frequently alternated between the Mediterranean Squadron and the Northern Squadron, the latter stationed in the English Channel, but neither location suited their poor handling.

Characteristics

The vessel displaced  and had a relatively low freeboard. Her superstructure was minimal and consisted of a small conning tower. She was fitted with a pair of tripod masts equipped with spotting tops for her main battery guns. The ship's crew consisted of 373 officers and enlisted men.

Her propulsion machinery consisted of two compound steam engines that drove a pair of screw propellers. Steam was provided by twelve coal-burning fire-tube boilers that were vented through a pair of funnels that were placed side by side, just aft of the conning tower.

Her main armament consisted of two  22-caliber M1875 guns, one forward and one aft, mounted on the centerline in barbettes. They were the largest-bore guns ever carried by a French capital ship. These were supported by a secondary battery of four  26.2-cal. M1881 guns carried in individual pivot mounts with gun shields. For defense against torpedo boats, she carried two  M1885 quick-firing guns and sixteen  Hotchkiss revolver cannon, all in individual mounts. Her armament was rounded out with four  torpedo tubes in the hull above the waterline, two tubes per side.

At even normal loading, the belt was nearly submerged entirely, reducing its effectiveness significantly. They were fitted with  hoods to protect the gun crews from shell fragments.

Modifications
Caïman was modernized several times during her career, primarily in attempts to correct deficiencies in her design that stemmed from excessive weights. She was found to be some  overweight, which hampered her seakeeping and reduced stability. The first refit took place at Toulon in late 1897, and involved lowering the funnel casings and removing the mainmast in an attempt to reduce weights high in the ship to improve her stability.

In 1899, Caïman returned to the shipyard in Toulon to be rearmed and further lightened. Her secondary battery was replaced with a quick-firing version of the 100 mm gun, with an additional pair being installed. The light battery was also revised to ten 47 mm guns and four 37 mm autocannon. Two of her torpedo tubes were also removed. Work on the ship lasted until 1903. As a result of these changes, her crew was reduced to 332 officers and men.

Service history
Caïman was laid down in Toulon on 16 August 1878 and was launched on 21 May 1885. Fitting out work then began, which included the installation of her propulsion machinery from 20 September 1885 to 25 April 1887. She was commissioned on 1 August 1887 to begin sea trials that lasted into 1888. These included tests conducted off the Îles d'Hyères from March to June 1888; her initial testing was interrupted by the annual fleet maneuvers. The ship was activated on 23 August 1888 for the exercises, and she departed the next day to join the rest of the fleet at Hyères. The fleet had assembled by 30 August and the maneuvers ended on 4 September, with the fleet returning to Toulon by the 10th. Caïman then resumed sea trials, which continued to mid-October, and on 16 October she was placed in the 2nd category of reserve. She was placed in full commission on 21 December and replaced her sister  in the Training Squadron on 25 January 1889. She was then placed in the 2nd category of reserve in 1890.

By the early 1890s, Caïman and her sister ships had been assigned to the Reserve Squadron of the Mediterranean Fleet, which was based in Toulon. During this period, the ships were maintained in a state of inactivity with half or two-thirds of their normal crews, only being mobilized for the annual training maneuvers with the rest of the fleet. The reserve ships took several days to ready themselves for the exercises before they were able to join the rest of the fleet by 6 July; the maneuvers lasted another five days thereafter.

In 1894, Caïman was assigned to the 1st Division, Reserve Squadron, along with Terrible and Richelieu. She served in the fleet maneuvers in the Mediterranean that year, which included an initial period of exercises from 1 to 10 July and then larger-scale maneuvers from 17 to 28 July. She remained in the unit the following year, by which time Indomptable and the ironclad Amiral Duperré had joined it. In 1896, the Reserve Squadron consisted of Amiral Duperré, the flagship, Caïman, Terrible, and Trident. 

Caïman was removed from the unit later that year to be modernized, including the installation of new boilers from May to October, and she conducted sea trials in November to evaluate the new boilers. Later that year, Caïman was reduced to the 2nd category of reserve to be rearmed, which lasted until 1903. By 1903, all four of the Terrible-class ironclads had been removed from service, their place in the Reserve Squadron having been taken by the pre-dreadnought battleships that had been built in the 1890s. In 1906, she returned to the Reserve Squadron in the Mediterranean Fleet for the annual maneuvers, along with Indomptable, Requin, the ironclad , and the pre-dreadnought battleship . Caïman was then laid up at Cherbourg later that year, where she remained in reserve until being struck from the naval register on 20 February 1911. She was condemned the following month on 22 March and converted into a hulk. She lingered on in that capacity until 1927 before being sold the following year to be broken up at Rochefort.

Notes

References
 
 
 
 
 
 
 
 
 
 
 
 
 

Terrible-class ironclads
1885 ships